{{Speciesbox
| image = OniHZ.jpg
| image_caption =
| taxon = Tomiyamichthys oni
| authority = (Tomiyama, 1936)
| synonyms = *Cryptocentrus oni Tomiyama, 1936
}}Tomiyamichthys oni'', the monster shrimpgoby, is a species of goby found in the Western Pacific: including Japan, New Guinea, Indonesia, Philippine Islands, Sabah, Palau, and New Caledonia.

References

External links

Fish of the Pacific Ocean
Tropical fish
Taxa named by Itiro Tomiyama
Fish described in 1936
oni